Fictional horses